Pisky-Radkivski is a village in Izium Raion (district) in Kharkiv Oblast of  eastern Ukraine, at about  south-east from the centre of Kharkiv city, on the eastern bank of the Oskil Reservoir.

The settlement came under attack by Russian forces during the Russian invasion of Ukraine in 2022 and was regained by Ukrainian forces by the end of September the same year.

Demographics
The settlement had 2507 inhabitants in 2001, native language distribution as of the Ukrainian Census of the same year:
Ukrainian: 91.34%
Russian: 8.42%
Belarusian: 0.08%
Armenian: 0.04%
German: 0.04%
Moldovan (Romanian): 0.04%

References

Villages in Izium Raion